The Zanesville YMCA, at 34 S. Fifth St. in Zanesville, Ohio, was built in 1919.  It was listed on the National Register of Historic Places in 1985.

It was designed by architect Cyrus McLane and built by the Lorenz Construction Co.  McLane was architect of the Rock Island YMCA, in Rock Island, Illinois, and of other YMCA buildings.

The building has been destroyed.

See also
Zanesville YWCA, also NRHP-listed

References

External links
Muskingum Family YMCA, 1861 Adams Lane, current website

YMCA buildings in the United States
National Register of Historic Places in Muskingum County, Ohio
Buildings and structures completed in 1919